Gualivá Province is one of the 15 provinces in the Cundinamarca Department, Colombia. Gualivá borders the Lower Magdalena Province to the west, to the north the Rionegro Province, to the east and southeast the Western Savanna Province, to the south slightly the Tequendama Province and to the southwest the Central Magdalena Province.

Municipalities 
Gualivá Province contains twelve municipalities:
 Albán
 La Peña
 La Vega
 Nimaima
 Nocaima
 Quebradanegra
 San Francisco
 Sasaima
 Supatá
 Útica
 Vergara 
 Villeta

References

External links 

  Gualivá Province in Cundinamarca

Provinces of Cundinamarca Department